Oppland Arbeiderblad (OA) is a newspaper based in Gjøvik, Norway.

It was founded in 1924 after the Labour Party lost its newspaper in the city, Ny Dag, to the Communists. At that time there were several daily newspapers in Vestoppland, but Oppland Arbeiderblad is now alone after Samhold went bankrupt in 1998.

References

External links

Newspapers established in 1924
1924 establishments in Norway
Daily newspapers published in Norway
Mass media in Gjøvik
Amedia
Labour Party (Norway) newspapers